Lorraine Fende (born August 15, 1956) was County Treasurer for Lake County, Ohio. Previously she was a Democratic member of the Ohio House of Representatives for the 62nd District.

Fende served as a councilwoman and mayor in Willowick, Ohio. She was first elected to the House of Representatives in 2004 when she won the seat of Republican Jamie Callender who was restricted by a term limit, by 53.4% to 46.6%. She was re-elected in 2006, 2008 and 2010. Fende has served as the chair of the Ohio House Democratic Women’s Caucus.

In 2011 she introduced a bill which would ban late-term abortions in the state.

References

Living people
Democratic Party members of the Ohio House of Representatives
Women state legislators in Ohio
Ohio University alumni
1956 births
Mayors of places in Ohio
Ohio city council members
Lakeland Community College alumni
Women city councillors in Ohio
21st-century American politicians
21st-century American women politicians
Women mayors of places in Ohio
People from Willowick, Ohio